Swaziland competed at the 1988 Summer Olympics in Seoul, South Korea.

Competitors
The following is the list of number of competitors in the Games.

Athletics

Men
Track and road events

Field events

Boxing

Men

Swimming

Men

Weightlifting

Men

References

Official Olympic Reports

Nations at the 1988 Summer Olympics
1988
Oly